North Carolina elected one of its members of the United States House of Representatives at-large statewide.  This only happened once, during the 48th United States Congress.  That member was Risden T. Bennett.

List of member representing the district

References

 Congressional Biographical Directory of the United States 1774–present

At-large
Former congressional districts of the United States
At-large United States congressional districts